The Leica SL (Typ 601) is a full-frame mirrorless interchangeable-lens camera announced by Leica Camera AG on 20 October 2015. The SL is promoted as a camera system for professional applications. Beside the Leica S-System, the Leica SL-System is the 2nd professional camera system in the company's product portfolio.

The SL (Typ 601) was succeeded by the Leica SL2 in 2019.

EyeRes Viewfinder 
The Leica SL (Typ 601) introduced the first EyeRes Viewfinder which is described by Leica as a combination of optical and electronic components. The resolution, angle of view and the refresh rate of the viewfinder should exceed the human eye's ability.

Leica L-Mount 
The Leica L-Mount is used by the Leica TL, CL and SL Systems. It was introduced by the Leica T (Typ 701) in April 2014. The L-Mount can hold lenses made for APS-C and for full frame sensor formats. The SL version of this mount is dust- and spray-water proof.  Lenses of TL and SL are compatible. There are several adapters for other lens mounts and lens makers that can be used on both TL and SL camera systems. The L-Mount Alliance, announced in September 2018, opened up the system to partners Panasonic and Sigma.

SL lenses 
Zoom
Vario-Elmarit-SL 1:2.8–4 / 24–90 ASPH. 
APO-Vario-Elmarit-SL 1:2.8–4 / 90–280 
Super-Vario-Elmar-SL 1:3.5-4.5 / 16-35 ASPH.

Prime
Summilux-SL 1:1.4 / 50 ASPH.  
APO-Summicron-SL 1:2 / 90 ASPH. 
APO-Summicron-SL 1:2 / 75 ASPH. 
APO-Summicron-SL 1:2 / 35 ASPH.
APO-Summicron-SL 1:2 / 50 ASPH.
APO-Summicron-SL 1:2 / 28 ASPH.

References

External links

SL (Typ 601)
Cameras introduced in 2015
Full-frame mirrorless interchangeable lens cameras